Stenared is a locality situated in Göteborg Municipality, Västra Götaland County, Sweden with 237 inhabitants in 2010.

References 

Populated places in Västra Götaland County
Populated places in Gothenburg Municipality